The Division of Canberra is an Australian electoral division in the Australian Capital Territory. It is named for the city of Canberra, Australia's national capital, and includes all of central Canberra, Kowen, Majura, as well as part of Weston Creek, Woden Valley, Molonglo Valley, Belconnen, and Jerrabomberra. It is currently held by Alicia Payne of the Labor Party.

Geography
Since 1984, federal electoral division boundaries in Australia have been determined at redistributions by a redistribution committee appointed by the Australian Electoral Commission. Redistributions occur for the boundaries of divisions in a particular state or territory, and they occur every seven years, or sooner if a state or territory's representation entitlement changes or when divisions of a state or territory are malapportioned.

As of 2018, the division of Canberra includes Canberra Central, the Woden Valley suburbs of Curtin, Chifley, Garran and Hughes, the Belconnen suburbs of Aranda, Bruce, Cook, Giralang, Hawker, Kaleen, Lawson and Weetangera, the Jerrabomberra suburbs of Beard and Oaks Estate and the districts of Majura and Kowen.

History

The division was created in a redistribution of the former Division of Australian Capital Territory, gazetted on 19 April 1974. It originally encompassed the southern suburbs of Canberra, including the districts of Tuggeranong, Weston Creek and Woden Valley. It also generally included the land in the ACT south of the Molonglo River and Lake Burley Griffin, although at one time some suburbs in the inner south of the lake were includes in the now abolished division of Fraser. Later the division included Reid and Campbell and prior to the 2018 redistribution, it included Civic, Acton, Turner south of Haig Park and east of Sullivans Creek, Braddon south of Haig Park, Reid, Campbell and Pialligo. From 2016, the division included Norfolk Island.

In 2018, the Australian Electoral Commission announced substantial alterations to the boundaries of the electorate, due to the creation of a new seat (the Division of Bean) covering the majority of the Australian Capital Territory, centred on its south, as well as Norfolk Island. The new Division of Canberra only covers Canberra's inner suburbs, Majura and Kowen in the Territory's north-east, the Belconnen suburbs of Aranda, Bruce, Cook, Giralang, Hawker, Kaleen, Lawson and Weetangera, and parts of Woden Valley north of Hindmarsh Drive.

For most of its history it has been a fairly safe seat for the Australian Labor Party, but it has been won by the Liberal Party three times, most recently at a 1995 by-election. In recent elections, the Australian Greens vote has increased steadily, with the party being only just under 4,000 votes of surpassing the Liberal Party on primary vote to enter the two-party preferred vote. In particular, the Greens came second on primary vote in 12 booths at the 2019 federal election, and won in two booths (Dickson East and Canberra City). However, the Labor Party retains a vote almost double that of the Greens in the electorate.

Members

Election results

References

External links
 Division of Canberra - Australian Electoral Commission

Electoral divisions of Australia
Constituencies established in 1974
1974 establishments in Australia